Curry Juneau (born August 3, 1934) is a former Canadian football player who played for the Edmonton Eskimos, Calgary Stampeders and Montreal Alouettes.

Juneau attended Mississippi Southern College and was drafted by the Cleveland Browns.

In 1964, Juneau was the coach of the Mobile Buccaneers of the Southern Professional Football League.

References

Living people
1934 births
Edmonton Elks players
Calgary Stampeders players
Montreal Alouettes players